The 2022 Blue-Emu Maximum Pain Relief 500 was a NASCAR Cup Series race held on April 9, 2022, at Martinsville Speedway in Ridgeway, Virginia. Contested over 403 laps – extended from 400 laps due to an overtime finish, on the 0.526 mile (0.847 km) paperclip-shaped short track, it was the eighth race of the 2022 NASCAR Cup Series season. The Honorary starter for the race was Blue crew member Hunter Bowen and the Grand Marshal was Blue Crew member Whit Blattner

Report

Background 

Martinsville Speedway is an NASCAR-owned stock car racing track located in Henry County, in Ridgeway, Virginia, just to the south of Martinsville. At  in length, it is the shortest track in the NASCAR Cup Series. The track was also one of the first paved oval tracks in NASCAR, being built in 1947 by H. Clay Earles. It is also the only remaining race track that has been on the NASCAR circuit from its beginning in 1948

Entry list
 (R) denotes rookie driver.
 (i) denotes driver who is ineligible for series driver points.

Practice

Practice results

Qualifying

Qualifying results

Race

Stage Results

Stage One
Laps: 80

Stage Two
Laps: 100

Final Stage Results

Stage Three
Laps: 220

Race statistics
 Lead changes: 5 among 4 different drivers
 Cautions/Laps: 4 for 36
 Red flags: 0
 Time of race: 2 hours, 40 minutes and 30 seconds
 Average speed:

Media

Television 
Fox Sports covered their 22nd race at the Martinsville Speedway. Mike Joy, 2018 Spring Martinsville winner Clint Bowyer and seven-time NASCAR Cup Series winning crew chief Chad Knaus called the race from the broadcast booth. Jamie Little and Regan Smith handled pit road for the television side. Larry McReynolds and Jamie McMurray provided insight from the Fox Sports studio in Charlotte.

Radio 
MRN had the radio call for the race which was also simulcasted on Sirius XM NASCAR Radio. Alex Hayden, Jeff Striegle and Rusty Wallace called the race in the booth when the field raced down the frontstretch. Dave Moody called the race from a platform inside the backstretch when the field races down the backstretch. Steve Post and Kim Coon worked pit road for the radio side.

Standings after the race

Drivers' Championship standings

Manufacturers' Championship standings

Note: Only the first 16 positions are included for the driver standings.
. – Driver has clinched a position in the NASCAR Cup Series playoffs.

References

Blue-Emu Maximum Pain Relief 400
Blue-Emu Maximum Pain Relief 400
Blue-Emu Maximum Pain Relief 400
NASCAR races at Martinsville Speedway